Ratnakar: A New Myth of Love is a 2019 Indian Assamese-language action thriller film directed by Jatin Bora and produced by Bora and Navanita Sharma's J.B. Production. The film stars Bora and Barsha Rani Bishaya, with Nishita Goswami, Pabitra Bora, Chetana Das, and Sanjeev Hazarika in supporting roles, and features the young Ashramika Saikia.

Plot 
Jayanta is a responsible father from a remote village who will go to any lengths for his beloved daughter, Dubori, who studies at the local school. After Dubori is publicly reprimanded by a teacher for low grades, she turns to her father for support. Jayanta confronts Daisy, the teacher, explaining the struggles he has faced raising Dubori as a single parent. Daisy sympathises with his situation, and decides to help Dubori with her studies; they form a bond.

Street thugs later make fun of Dubori and Daisy in a park. Jayanta runs away instead of confronting the thugs, leading Daisy to think of him as a coward. That night, Jayanta (dressed as a robber) finds the thugs and beats them up one by one. Unbeknownst to Jayanta, Daisy sees this and is shocked. She asks Jayanta who he is, and he reveals his past.

In a flashback, Jayanta is a gangster for a powerful businessman in Guwahati. The businessman has a daughter, Manashi, who is studying abroad. When she returns home, she meets Jayanta and is attracted to his kindness; he runs a social service for the elderly, whom he considers his only family. Jayanta and Manashi begin dating, although Manashi has no idea that Jayanta is a gangster for her father. Manashi sees him threatening an innocent man, as ordered by her father; days later, he apologises to her and says he did it for the old people he helps. She tells him to get a legitimate job, and she will help support him. Jayanta quits being a gangster and finds an ordinary job. Manashi marries him, despite opposition from her father and her cruel brother, and becomes pregnant. She dies in a car crash, but the baby is saved. Manashi's father wants to take revenge on Jayanta by taking the baby from him, but Jayanta and his child escape to the remote village.

In the present, Manashi's father, brother, and gang are still searching for the child; they find Dubori, and kidnap her. Jayanta rescues his daughter; Manashi's father, realising his mistake, gives them both his blessing. The film ends with Jayanta, Dubori, and Daisy riding Jayanta's bicycle.

Cast 
The cast includes:
 Jatin Bora as Jayanta
 Barsha Rani Bishaya as Manashi
 Nishita Goswami as Daisy
 Ashramika Saikia as Dubori, Jayanta and Manashi's daughter
 Sanjeev Hazarika as Devaraj Choudhary, Manashi's father and Jayanta's former father-in-law
 Padmarag Goswami as Rakesh Choudhary, Manashi's brother
 Chetana Das as a senior citizen
 Bishnu Kharghoria as a senior citizen
 Hiranya Deka as a senior citizen

Reception

Box office 
Ratnakar was released on 11 October 2019 in 59 theatres in Assam and 11 theatres in Delhi, Mumbai, Pune, Bangalore and Hyderabad. The film had a positive audience response, with almost 80-percent theatre capacity during its first three days. It grossed 42 lakh on its opening day, the highest gross for an Assamese film to date. On the film's second day, it grossed 49.5 lakh. It earned  in two weeks, an Assamese box-office record. According to Ratnakar distributors, the film netted 9.23 crore by 14 November 2019.;

Soundtrack 
Ratnakar soundtrack contains six songs composed by Zubeen Garg, and was released by Dhwani Records. Its songs were sung by Zubeen Garg, Gayatri Hazarika, Harchita Bhattacharya, Satabdi Borah, Navanita Sharma , Jashua Queah, and Synicah.

See also 
Kanchanjangha
Pratighat

References

External links 
 

2019 films
Indian films about revenge
2010s Assamese-language films